The Germanasca (also in Piedmontese Germanasca) is a  Italian torrent, which runs through the Metropolitan City of Turin. It is a tributary of the Chisone, into which it flows near Perosa Argentina. The valley formed by the river is known as Val Germanasca.

Geography

The stream is formed from Lago Verde, a small Alpine lake in the Cottian Alps, and initially runs northwards, before reaching the comune of Salza di Pinerolo and turning east. It then receives the waters of the Germanasca di Salza and Germanasca di Massello increasing a lot its average discharge.
After the end of its course through the Germanasca Valley it reaches the Chisone at Perosa Argentina.

Notes and references

Other projects

Rivers of the Province of Turin
Rivers of the Alps
Rivers of Italy